Onega is a genus of leafhoppers in the family Cicadellidae.

Description 
All nine described species of the Genus Onega are comparably large leafhoppers with a size between 12.4 and 16.8 Millimeters. The pronotum of Onega is typically wider than the head and the Scutellum is swollen.

Distribution 
Onega occurs in the Andean rainforests of Peru, Ecuador, Colombia and Bolivia. Old records of Onega from the Caribbean islands are now believed to have been mislabelled.

Species
 Onega avella Distant, 1908
 Onega bracteata Young, 1977
 Onega fassli Young, 1977
 Onega freytagi Takiya & Cavichioli, 2004
 Onega krameri Takiya & Cavichioli, 2004
 Onega orphne Takiya & Cavichioli, 2004
 Onega sanguinicollis (Latreille, 1807)
 Onega stella Distant, 1908
 Onega stipata (Walker, 1851)

References

Cicadellidae genera
Cicadellini